Fallesen is a surname. Notable people with the surname include:

Edvard Fallesen (1817–1894), Danish army officer, politician, and theatre manager
Steffan Sondermark Fallesen (born 1981), Danish internet entrepreneur

Danish-language surnames